Wrongchilde is the solo project of Mat Devine, lead singer of Kill Hannah.  The project was started in 2013 and they released their first album Gold Blooded on August 19, 2014. The album was self-released through PledgeMusic.

History
Wrongchilde started when Mat Devine moved to Los Angeles to work on the project and begin his first solo album Gold Blooded.  The name came to him in a dream while he was in high school, and he began scratching it on books and things, not knowing why.

Gold Blooded
Gold Blooded is Wrongchilde's first album, and was released on August 19, 2014.  The album features duets with Gerard Way of My Chemical Romance, Morgan Kibby of White Sea and M83, and Sierra Kusterbeck of VersaEmerge.

The project was completely self-financed through PledgeMusic. Wrongchilde's first single, "Falling In Love Will Kill You", featuring Gerard Way received over 85k streams on SoundCloud in the first few weeks.

Discography

External links
Official Website

References

Musical groups established in 2013
Alternative rock groups from California
American electronic rock musical groups
2013 establishments in California